Ian Cook is Associate Professor of Geography at the University of Exeter in the UK, and formerly senior lecturer in geography at the University of Birmingham, and lecturer at the University of Wales, Lampeter.

Background
BSc in Human Sciences, University College London, 1986; MA Human Geography, University of Kentucky 1992; PhD,  University of Bristol, 1997. His cultural geography PhD was highly autobiographical, and took several years to be awarded. He began his academic career at the University of Wales, Lampeter (1993-9), then worked at the University of Birmingham (1999-2007), before moving to Exeter in 2007.

Contributions
Geographies of commodification, particularly tracing the paths of reference to exotic fruit and fashion items. Cook argues that commodities are connected to the home and bodies, but their origins are often overlooked; we should learn where commodities come from. Ethnographic methods of inquiry, and new media and blogging. He has written more widely on human geography, including one major textbook.

Publications 
Ian Cook and Mike Crang. 2007. Doing ethnographies. London: Sage.
Paul Cloke, Ian Cook, Philip Crang, Mark Goodwin, Joe Painter & Chris Philo. 2004. Practising human geographies. London: Sage
Ian Cook, Simon Naylor, James Ryan, David Crouch (eds.). 2000. Cultural turns / geographical turns: perspectives on cultural geography. Harlow, Longman.
 Ian Cook et al., 2004, Follow the Thing: Papaya, Antipode 36, 4: 642-664

See also
Lampeter Geography School

References

Living people
Alumni of the University of Bristol
Academics of the University of Birmingham
Academics of the University of Exeter
British geographers
Year of birth missing (living people)